The Breeders' 2009 tour consisted of sixteen North American dates in August 2009. The tour was in support of their EP Fate to Fatal. The lineup for the band in 2009 consisted of sisters Kim and Kelley Deal, Mando Lopez, Jose Medeles, and Cheryl Lindsey. Former member Josephine Wiggs played bass for the final three shows, because Lopez's wife was having a baby. Songs the group performed included "The She", "Little Fury", "Night of Joy", "New Year", "Fate to Fatal", "Divine Hammer", "No Aloha", "Iris", and "Walk It Off". They also played the Amps' "I Am Decided" and "Tipp City".

Dates

Notes

References

 
 
 
 
 
 
 
 
 
 
 
 

2009 concert tours
2009 in American music
August 2009 events in the United States
Concert tours of Canada
Concert tours of the United States
Tour 2009